Srebrnik is a settlement on the right bank of the Sotla River in the Municipality of Bistrica ob Sotli in eastern Slovenia, next to the border with Croatia. The area is part of the traditional region of Styria. It is now included in the Lower Sava Statistical Region; until January 2014 it was part of the Savinja Statistical Region.

References

External links
Srebrnik on Geopedia

Populated places in the Municipality of Bistrica ob Sotli